Moonfish may refer to several groups of fishes:

 Family Monodactylidae (properly moonyfishes)
 Ocean sunfish
 Opah, genus Lampris
 Genus Mene
 Mene maculata, only extant member of the genus
 Selene (fish)
 Atlantic spadefish (Chaetodipterus faber)
 Cusk (fish)
 Southern platyfish

See also
 Ocean sunfish is called "moon fish" in many languages
 Moonfish (My Hero Academia), a character in the manga series My Hero Academia
 Moonfish, a Throughbred horse which placed second in the 1988 Haynes, Hanson and Clark Conditions Stakes